European route E 48 is a road part of the International E-road network. It begins in Schweinfurt, Germany and ends in Prague, Czech Republic. 

The road follows the route:
 Germany
 : Schweinfurt, Bayreuth
 : Marktredwitz
 Czech Republic
 : Cheb, Karlovy Vary, Prague

References

External links 
 UN Economic Commission for Europe: Overall Map of E-road Network (2007)

48
E048
E048